Mthobeli Bangindawo (born 6 May 1995) is a South African cricketer. He made his first-class debut for South Western Districts cricket team on 13 October 2016.

References

External links
 

Living people
1995 births
South African cricketers
South Western Districts cricketers